is a former Japanese football player and manager. He managed Japan women's national team.

Coaching career
In October 1984, Japan women's national team was formed for the first time in three years for a China expedition, and Japan Football Association appointed Orii as Japan national team manager. Japan played 3 matches against Italy and Australia in Xi'an. However Japan lost in all matches.

Result

References

External links

Year of birth missing (living people)
Living people
Japanese footballers
Japanese football managers
Japan women's national football team managers
Association footballers not categorized by position